The Plunderers is a 1948 American Western film directed by Joseph Kane and written by Gerald Geraghty and Gerald Drayson Adams. The film stars Rod Cameron, Ilona Massey, Lorna Gray, Forrest Tucker, George Cleveland and Grant Withers. The film was released on October 31, 1948, by Republic Pictures.

Plot

Cast    
Rod Cameron as John Drum
Ilona Massey as Lin Connor
Lorna Gray as Julie Ann McCabe 
Forrest Tucker as Whit Lacey
George Cleveland as Sheriff Sam Borden
Grant Withers as Deputy Tap Lawrence
Taylor Holmes as Eben Martin
Paul Fix as Calico
Francis Ford as Barnaby
James Flavin as Sergeant Major
Hank Bell as Stagecoach Driver
Russell Hicks as Cavalry Colonel
Maude Eburne as Old Dame at Wedding
Mary Ruth Wade as Pioneer Girl
Louis Faust as Fort Sentry

References

External links 
 

1948 films
American Western (genre) films
1948 Western (genre) films
Republic Pictures films
Films directed by Joseph Kane
1940s English-language films
1940s American films